Epimetasia abbasalis is a moth in the family Crambidae. It was described by Hans Georg Amsel in 1974. It is found in southern Iran.

References

Moths described in 1974
Odontiini